Josef Emanuel Hilscher (22 January 1806 – 2 November 1837) was an Austrian soldier, poet and translator of others' poetry. He became a soldier, and rose to quartermaster, but he is remembered for his own exuberant poems, and highly regarded translations into German of Byron's poems. Hilscher's poems were published after his death by fellow Austrian poet Ludwig Frankl (1810–1894) as editor of 'Oesterreichisches Morgenblatt'.

External links
 Hilscher_Josef-Emanuel_1806_1837.xml

Lord Byron
19th-century Austrian poets
1806 births
1837 deaths
People from Litoměřice
British male dramatists and playwrights
Austrian male poets
Austrian translators